David Seaborg (born 1949) is an evolutionary biologist, peace activist, author and leader in the environmental movement.  He serves as director of the World Rainforest Fund, the Seaborg Open Space Fund, and the Greater Lafayette Open Space Fund (a conservancy raising money to purchase open space in the Lamorinda region).

Life
David Seaborg was born on April 22, 1949, in Berkeley, California and is the son of Helen L. Seaborg and Nobel Laureate Glenn T. Seaborg (who discovered plutonium among other accomplishments). He attended and graduated from the University of California, Davis, with a bachelor's degree in zoology. Seaborg received his master's degree from the University of California, Berkeley. David Seaborg has dedicated his career to environmentalism and was coincidentally born on Earth Day in 1949. He is listed in Who's Who in America, which publishes notable biographies and historical events. David Seaborg resides in Walnut Creek, California.

David Seaborg worked to conceive and secure passage through the Berkeley City Council an ordinance that would ban the use of old growth rainforest and redwood in all products used by the city of Berkeley. This ordinance also required all businesses contracting with Berkeley to stop using old growth rainforest and redwood in any of the products or services that Berkeley hired to use or perform as well as in any product that was sold to the city. He is currently working with the Berkeley city council to secure passage of an ordinance banning the use of plastic bags in grocery stores and plastic newspaper wrappings in the city.

Seaborg has published several scientific articles discussing biological topics such as evolution, behavioral plasticity, and biodiversity. He wrote an article entitled The Greenhouse Diet in the Earth Island Journal in the winter of 2004 that is a summary of the scientific research on the effects of high atmospheric levels of carbon dioxide other than global warming. This article states that as the amount of carbon dioxide in the air increases the plants grow larger but are less rich in nutrients despite the excess of carbon dioxide. Seaborg has also written a book consisting of a collection of poems entitled Honor Thy Sowbug (2008). 

David Seaborg has written a biography for his late father, Glenn T. Seaborg, which details Glenn Seaborg's upbringing and contributions to nuclear science from the perspective of his son. This biographical account of his father includes personal anecdotes of Glenn Seaborg's life that discuss his accomplishments and personality in an intimate manner.

David Seaborg founded and heads the World Rainforest Fund, a nonprofit foundation dedicated to saving the earth's tropical rainforests and biodiversity. He also founded and headed the Seaborg Open Space Fund, named in honor of his father, to raise money and awareness to save open space from development in central Contra Costa County. This fund raised $20,000 in less than a year to successfully help save Acalanes Ridge in Lafayette, California.

In the 1990s and part of the first decade of this century, he served on the Board of Directors and as Vice President of the Club of Rome of the USA, the environmental think tank that published The Limits to Growth in the 1970s.

He was on the Board of Directors of the East Bay Chapter of the United Nations Association of the U. S. A. from 2006 to 2009. He gave the keynote address at their last annual meeting, and helped secure the passage of key resolutions on biodiversity and global warming and the Kyoto Protocol, at the local, state, and national levels of the UNA/ USA.

References

External links
Biography at the World Rainforest Fund
 to American Atheists in 2000
"David Seaborg: Rainforests and Global Warming", Steppin out of Babylon
David Seaborg's twitter

1949 births
Living people
American activists
American atheists
Evolutionary biologists
University of California, Davis alumni